The Sibbersdorfer See is a lake in the district of Ostholstein within the region known as Holstein Switzerland in the North German state of Schleswig-Holstein.

It lies between Sibbersdorf and Fissau, north of the Großer Eutiner See, near the town of Eutin.

Gull island 
There is a gull island, about 5,000 square metres in area in the Sibbersdorfer See.
Until it was sold in 1988, gull eggs were collected here.
When this practice ended, the island became increasingly overgrown as it was no longer mown.

The Eutin-Malente Bird Conservation Group took over this maintenance function in 1995 and the number of breeding pairs increased again.

Reed buntings and reed warblers have no longer bred here since the end of the 1990s.

In 2004 1,051 breeding pairs of birds of 19 species were counted, including: 750 pairs of black-headed gulls (1996: 50 pairs), three pairs of Mediterranean gulls, 22 pairs of common terns, 15 pairs of Canada geese, one pair of oystercatchers, two peewit pairs, 12 pairs of graylag geese, 49 pairs of tufted duck and a pair of mute swans.

 

Lakes of Schleswig-Holstein
LSibberstorfer See